The women's 1500 metres event at the 2016 African Championships in Athletics was held on 24 June in Kings Park Stadium.

Results

References

2016 African Championships in Athletics
1500 metres at the African Championships in Athletics
2016 in women's athletics